Kim Ung-Yong (Hangul: 김웅용; born March 8, 1962) is a South Korean mathematician. He was a child prodigy who held the world record Guinness World Records for the highest IQ, at 210. After working at NASA at age eight, he returned to South Korea in order to attain a PhD and withdrew from significant media attention.

Biography

Early life 
Kim Ung-yong was born on March 8, 1962, in Seoul, South Korea. His father was a physics professor and his mother was a medical professor. By the time he was a year old, Kim had learned both the Korean alphabet and 1,000 Chinese characters by studying the Thousand Character Classic, a 6th-century Chinese poem.

At three years old, he was able to solve calculus problems, and he also published a best-selling book of his essays in English and German, as well as his calligraphy and illustrations. By the age of five, Kim could speak Korean, English, French, German and Japanese. That year, he enrolled at Grant High School in Los Angeles after an article was published about him in Look magazine that caught the attention of the school. He also audited a physics class at Hanyang University.

Fuji TV appearance 

At the age of five, Kim appeared on Fuji Television in Japan and shocked the audience by solving differential equations. Later he appeared on Japanese television again, where he solved complicated differential and integral calculus problems.

Education 
 

A popular rumour was that when he was eight years old, Kim allegedly went to study nuclear physics at the University of Colorado, according to popular sources. This, however, has been disputed and disproved from sources at the time. In the time of his college entrance exam's fitness section, where he gained much media attention, his father revealed to reporters that going to Japan to shoot the Fuji TV show was the "one and only time he went out of the country", and that the information of his Ph.D and master's degree progress in the States was "journalistic nonsense". His statement that Kim did not leave at all is slightly detracted by the statement of Kim's mother, who stated that while he did "leave for a short moment to audit classes at the University of Colorado", he was returned immediately due to their facilities being "inadequate for the [Kim]'s genius", who was then homeschooled until his college entrance exam. While the specifics may be blurred, it is clear that the evidence is in favour of his attendance at the University of Colorado being a misconstrued rumour.

Upon returning to South Korea, Kim was required to formally complete South Korean schooling in order to get a job. He earned his elementary, middle, and high school degrees in just two years. He later enrolled in Chungbuk National University where he studied civil engineering and earned a Ph.D.

Adulthood
, he served as adjunct faculty at Chungbuk National University. On March 14, 2014, he became associate professor in Shinhan University, and became vice president of North Kyeong-gi Development Research Center.

In 2010, Kim criticized the idea that he is a "failed genius" and additionally said, "Some think people with a high IQ can be omnipotent, but that's not true. Look at me, I don't have musical talent, nor am I excelling in sports. [...] Society should not judge anyone with unilateral standards – everyone has different learning levels, hopes, talents, and dreams and we should respect that."

References 

1962 births
Living people
South Korean expatriates in the United States
People from Seoul
Guinness World Records
Grant High School (Los Angeles) alumni
University of Colorado alumni
Hanyang University alumni
NASA people
Chungbuk National University alumni
Academic staff of Chungbuk National University